"Ordinary Angels" is a song by Australian indie pop group, Frente!. The song was not released as single in Australia. It was released in North America and Europe in 1993 and included on their first full-length album Marvin the Album.
The song won 'breakthrough artist' at the ARIA Music Awards of 1993

Track listing
 European CD Single
 "Ordinary Angels" (A Hart, S Austin) - 2:37
 "Book Song"	(S Austin) - 2:39
 "Seamless" (M Picton) - 2:59
 "Nadi" (A Hart) - 0:34

 North American CD Single
 "Ordinary Angels" - 2:51
 "Most Beautiful" (Acoustic Version) - 2:32
 "Ordinary Angels" (Acoustic Version) - 2:41
 " Kelly Street" (Acoustic Version) - 3:18

 1994 CD Remixes
 "Ordinary Angels"	- 2:48
 "Ordinary Angels" (7'' Remix) - 2:48
 "Ordinary Angels" (Ayonarra Mix) - 2:52

External links

References

1993 singles
1992 songs
ARIA Award-winning songs
Frente! songs